Money Run is a stream in the U.S. state of West Virginia.

Money Run was named after Money Bates, a pioneer settler.

See also
List of rivers of West Virginia

References

Rivers of Wetzel County, West Virginia
Rivers of West Virginia